Elisabeth Neurdenburg (1882–1957) was a Dutch art historian.

She contributed to the large inventory of 17th-century Dutch paintings by Cornelis Hofstede de Groot, and became a specialist on Dutch Kraak ware. She was a close friend of the Dutch art historian and museum director Ida Caroline Eugenie Peelen.

Works
 Old Dutch pottery and tiles, 1923
 Hofstede de Groot's final Volume 10 of Beschreibendes kritisches Verzeichnis der Werke der hervorragendsten Holländischen Mahler des XVII. Jahrhunderts (1907–28), on Frans van Mieris, Willem van Mieris, Adriaen van der Werff, Rachel Ruysch, Jan van Huysum, produced with assistance by Otto Hirschmann, and Kurt Bauch, 1928
 Hendrick de Keyser, beeldhouwer en bouwmeester van Amsterdam, 1934

References

Elisabeth Neurdenburg in the Dictionary of Art Historians

1882 births
1957 deaths
People from Breda
Dutch art historians
Dutch women historians
Dutch women writers
Women art historians